Mamırlı (also, Mamyrly) is a village and municipality in the Tartar Rayon of Azerbaijan.  It has a population of 1,547.

References 

Populated places in Tartar District